The Barra is a name for the engine range, including the inline-6 and SOHC V8 in the Ford Australia Falcon between 2002 and 2016. The inline-6 engines are unique to the Australian manufactured Falcon and Territory and were developed and manufactured in Geelong, Victoria. The Barra was first introduced in the BA Falcon, named after the "Barramundi" code name used during the development of the BA update engine. The V8 engine, from Essex, Ontario, were discontinued with the FG model whereas the I6 engines continued production until 26 September 2016, coinciding with the end of production of the Falcon and Territory on 7 October.

Inline 6
All Barra I6 engines are DOHC with Variable valve timing and contain 24 valves.  They are a development of the SOHC "Intech" I6s produced between 1998 and 2002, or the SOHC produced from 1988 to 1998, which in turn are a development of the 3.3 and 4.1 L push-rod flat-tappet I6, developed in Australia as an "Alloy Head" Crossflow in 1980, eventually in both carburetted and injected versions, which itself was developed from the original iron-head cross flow engine from 1976, and which in turn was developed, again in Australia, from the original non-cross flow family of light Ford sixes which originated in North America as the "Thriftpower Six" designed for the original American Ford Falcon compact of 1959, initially in just a 144 cubic inch (2.4 L) displacement.

Petrol

Barra 182
This engine is found in the 6-cylinder variants of the BA Falcon (also derivative models Fairmont and Fairlane), and SX Territory, and was produced between late 2002 and mid 2005. This was the first Falcon engine that came standard with DOHC and Variable Cam Timing. This contributed to the significant jump in output over the base 157 kW SOHC Intech engine in the previous generation AU Falcon and a 10 kW gain over the Tickford enhanced VCT engine's 172 kW. It also kept Ford's engine power outputs above those of the Holden Ecotec and L67 supercharged V6 engines found in the Holden VY Commodore.
Power:  @ 5250 rpm
Torque:  @ 3250 rpm
Compression Ratio: 9.7:1

Barra 190
This engine is found in the BF Falcon and SY/SY II Territory, and was produced between late 2005 and early 2008. It is aesthetically the same and mechanically very similar to the Barra 182. Changes from its predecessor include an increase in compression ratio, a slight revision of the cam profiles, a revision of the air intake system, the introduction of dual independent variable camshaft timing, a secondary knock sensor and an upgraded ECU, which allowed for more sophisticated ignition timing and spark control. These changes led to a slight increase in power to 190 kW.
Power:  @ 5250 rpm
Torque:  @ 2500 rpm
Compression Ratio: 10.3:1

Barra 195
The Barra 195 is the last version of the naturally aspirated I6 engine and is found in the FG/FG-X Falcon and SZ/SZ II Territory. Changes from its predecessor include a new plastic inlet manifold & throttle body (replacing the broadband manifold intake which originated in the naturally aspirated EF Falcon) and a redesigned cylinder head with 'Fast Burn' swirl changes to the inlet port. These changes achieved power and economy improvements over the Barra 190. The engine also moved to a rear sump design to suit the new FG Falcon front sub-frame.

Power:  @ 6000 rpm
Torque:  @ 3250 rpm
Compression Ratio: 10.3:1

Turbocharged Petrol

Barra 240T
This engine is found in the BA Falcon XR6 Turbo, and was produced between late 2002 and mid 2005. It is similar to the naturally aspirated Barra 182, except it has different pistons to lower the compression ratio, a single Garrett GT35/82r turbocharger, higher base fuel pressure, Inconel exhaust valves, red rocker cover, and an intercooler.
Power:  @ 5250 rpm
Torque:  @ 2000-4500 rpm
Compression Ratio: 8.7:1

Barra 245T

This engine is found in the BF Falcon XR6 Turbo and the SY Territory Turbo, and was produced between mid 2005 and early 2008. It is internally very similar to its predecessor, with the 5 kW power increase found through the changes introduced by the Barra 190 (revised camshaft profiles and more powerful ECU, enabling dual independent VCT with an extra knock sensor). Aesthetically the engine is the same as the previous model, with the exception of the Territory Turbo using a black rocker cover and a top mounted intercooler. In May 2006, the engine received a minor internal upgrade which addressed concerns of bending con-rods, by introducing stronger con-rods.
Power:  @ 5250 rpm
Torque:  @ 2000-4500 rpm
Compression Ratio: 8.9:1

Barra 270T (BA / BF FPV)

This engine is found in the BA/BF Falcon based FPV F6 Typhoon and Tornado models, and the SY Territory based FPV F6X, and was produced between 2004 and early 2009. It is the high-power variant of the Barra 240/245T versions found in the XR6 Turbo. The increase in power is achieved through the use of higher boost pressures from the otherwise under-utilised large Garrett GT3540 turbocharger, a larger intercooler, revised air intake. These are differentiated from the standard turbo engines by the unique FPV blue-coloured rocker cover. With the introduction of the BF Falcon in 2005, the 270T also inherited the upgrades found in the 245T, but the power figures were left unchanged.
Power:  @ 5250 rpm
Torque:  @ 2000-4250 rpm
Compression Ratio: 8.7:1

Barra 270T (FG)
This engine is found in the FG/FG-X Falcon XR6 Turbo, and was produced between mid 2008 and late 2016. Although the power figures for the revised turbo engine mimic the old FPV turbo I6, the engines are quite different. It has a redesigned low-profile log style intake manifold, a smaller turbocharger which spools faster, a new intercooler, redesigned pistons to increase compression. The result is that the FG XR6 Turbo is faster than the FPV's BF Typhoon although they share the same power output. This engine introduces a transient over-boost feature for a maximum of 10 seconds when optimal atmospheric conditions are met when under full throttle, which increases torque to a maximum of 586 Nm.

Power:  @ 5250 rpm
Torque:  @ 2000-4750 rpm
Compression Ratio: 8.8:1

Barra 310T
This engine is found in the FG Falcon based FPV F6. It is the high-power variant of the FG XR6 Turbo's Barra 270T. It was produced between mid 2008 and mid 2014, ending production when FPV shut down.

Power:  @ 5500 rpm
Torque:  @ 1950-5200 rpm
Compression Ratio: 8.47:1

Barra 325T
The final and most powerful variant of the Barra engine featured in the FG-X XR6 Sprint. This engine is the most powerful six cylinder produced in Australia and was built in very limited numbers, with only 500 for Australia and 50 for New Zealand (True production is 560, as 10 pre-production vehicles were built and auctioned off). Each engine had its own numbered build plaque attached to the rocker cover, which is painted in the same colour as the Territory Turbo rocker cover. The engine is based internally upon the Barra 270T, with extras added from the Barra 310T variant such as the turbo, intercooler and injectors. In an Australian first, Ford also employed a custom designed carbon fibre air intake which increased airflow by 45 percent. It was chosen to base the engine on the 270T instead of the 310T due to the increased compression ratio. The engine yet again employs Ford's over-boost feature, which when the correct conditions are met will increase engine output to 370 kW and 650 Nm.

Power:  @ 6000 rpm
Torque:  @ 2750 rpm
Compression Ratio: 8.8:1

Internals
According to Ford Program Manager David Burn and Program Analyst Justin Capicchiano, there are differences in the internals between turbo models, however no forged internals have been used.

Liquefied Petroleum Gas

Barra E-Gas
This engine was launched in 2002 with the BA Falcon and was a development of the Intech E-Gas engine.  The E-Gas engine is designed to run on autogas only. It features a Mild-performance, high-reliability, low-maintenance Vialle closed-loop single-point venturi-style LPG-injector-less carburetion system in lieu of the standard sequential petrol injection system.  This engine was carried over to the FG Falcon with only one option of a 4-Speed automatic transmission, without traction control but was replaced in mid-2011 by the EcoLPi system, which featured the ZF 6HP26 6-speed automatic transmission and traction control as per fitted to the petrol models. 
Power:  @ 4750-5000 rpm
Torque:  @ 2750-3000 rpm
Compression Ratio (BA E-Gas): 10.7:1
Compression Ratio (BF / FG E-Gas): 10.3:1

Barra EcoLPi
This engine was launched in 2011 as a replacement for the E-Gas engine. It features a liquid phase injection autogas system, allowing for much higher power and torque than previously.
Power:  @ 5000 rpm
Torque:  @ 3250 rpm
Compression Ratio: 12.0:1

Discontinuation 
On 23 May 2013, Ford Australia confirmed that the Barra engine would be discontinued along with the Ford Falcon and Territory by October 2016. Ford Australia's engine manufacturing operations ceased on 26 September 2016 and car assembly on 7 October 2016. Ford Australia president Bob Graziano cited unprofitability due to high labour costs and dwindling market share for the demise of local manufacturing.

Tuning community 
In the years following the discontinuation of the Barra 6, it gained enormous popularity among tuners, and a common engine swap, as people discovered the strength of the Barra, into X series Falcons, Australian Cortinas, Mustangs and in the U.S.A in Shelby GTs. The Barra has gained incredible support the world across with components and conversion kits for a lot of cars. The Barra is capable of easily holding 800hp with the factory engine block, rods and pistons.

V8 

The Barra V8 (not to be confused with the Australian-made Barra I6), manufactured at the Essex, Ontario, Canada engine plant, was based on the Ford modular engine. All were 90-degree V8 engines with a displacement of 5.4 litres.  All are SOHC with VCT incorporating 3 valves per cylinder. The Falcon was the first vehicle to use Ford's VCT Modular engine.

While in previous generations of Falcon the V8 had been the most powerful option, the turbocharged I-6 engine produced more power than the base 220 kW V8. With time, the turbocharged I6 engine found strong favour with enthusiasts, due to its ease of tuning for more power and the cheaper yearly registration fees associated with fewer cylinders in some Australian states such as Queensland.

Specifications:
Block Material: Cast Iron
Cylinder Heads Material: Aluminum Alloy
Crankshaft Material: Cast Iron
Maximum Engine Speed: 5250 RPM
Bore: 90.2 mm
Stroke: 105.8 mm
Compression Ratio : 10.3 : 1
Firing Order : 1-3-7-2-6-5-4-8
Displacement: 5408 cc
Number of valves: 24 (two inlet valves with 34.00 mm and one exhaust valve at 37.5 mm per cylinder)

Barra 220 
This was an optional engine on the BA Falcon and was produced between October 2002 and October 2005. 
Power:  @ 4750 rpm
Torque:  from 3250-4000 rpm ( @ 3250RPM)

Barra 230 
Introduced in October 2005 as an option for the BF Falcon, the Barra 230 introduced dual knock sensors instead of the single knock sensor on the BA Falcon.  It also had more aggressive ignition calibration, slight increase in compression ratio, and various ECU modifications to comply with Euro III emissions standards. This is done safely with the addition of another knock sensor. It was in production from 2005 until the release of the FG Falcon. 
Power:  @ 5350 rpm
Torque:  @ 3500 rpm

See also
Undersquare
Ford of Australia modern V8s

References

External links 
Ford Australia

Barra
Straight-six engines
Gasoline engines by model